Pingtai Subdistrict is a subdistrict of Liangyuan District, Shangqiu, Henan province, People's Republic of China, located on the southeastern outskirts of the city. , it has 11 villages under its administration.

See also 
 List of township-level divisions of Henan

References 

Township-level divisions of Henan